The New Strand Shopping Centre, known locally simply as The Strand, is the main shopping centre in Bootle, Merseyside, England. Opened in 1968, it was part of a larger Bootle redevelopment during this period, which was also complemented by the establishment of the Girobank headquarters in nearby Netherton. The site occupied by the shopping centre was formally victorian houses, in streets that were named after American states. The decision on naming the shopping centre was done so via a public competition, with an 11-year-old school girl submitting the winning entry of "New Strand" in 1965. The Strand opened at a cost of £5 million in 1968, in the centenary year of Bootle receiving its municipal charter.

The centre was extended between 1997 and 1998 and completed in November the same year to provide additional retail outlets, as well as additional car-parking facilities and improved transportation to the centre. The Strand centre is widely known for the 1993 abduction of toddler James Bulger, who was taken by two ten-year-old boys and later murdered.

In October 2014, it was announced that London-based Ellandi had purchased the shopping centre, yet it was sold to Sefton Council just two and a half years later.

History

Planning

Bootle was undergoing a major regeneration during the 1960s, of which the shopping centre was expected to be among the highlights. During a council meeting in October 1961, approval was given for the town's development plan and the compulsory purchase of property on Stanley Road. The council had previously appointed shopping consultants in 1956 to advise on what would be required, with particular focus on the Strand Road-Stanley Road regionand the findings suggesting that facilities were "inadequate", with a danger to pedestrians and insufficient parking available. The region identified was already to be part of a slum clearance programme. Despite other sites being considered, the Stanley Road-Strand Road site was ultimately chosen due to it already needing significant redevelopment and it offered the best prospect for the creation of a new retail shopping centre, situated strategically close to a railway station and within easy access to the wider Merseyside region. Mr T. H. Pigot of the Bootle No 1 Objectors Association considered Linacre Lane to have been a more suitable location, but accepted that transport connections in the region were inadequate.

Public inquiry
Due to the need to compulsory purchase existing property, a public inquiry was held in 1962 by Mr M. B. Tetlow for the Ministry of Housing and Local Government. At the second day of the inquiry, William Roots MP suggested that the shopping district then present on Stanley Road did "not measure up to modern standard", noting the area's shops were predominantly shop conversions from old properties which had not been successful in keeping up with the times. Concerns were also raised by the Bootle Traders' Association, who expressed that higher rents charged in the new centre could "squeeze the smaller trader against the wall", causing instability to existing smaller traders with the risk of liquidation. A Bootle estate agent and surveyor told the inquiry that the main shopping region of the area should be improved rather than redeveloped, citing concerns over rent costs which in the proposed shopping centre "would be more than double the existing rents for property in the area", expressing concerns this could drive away local traders in favour of national chains.

Land acquisition

Although approval for the scheme was expected imminently during a press conference in November 1963, town planning modifications were needed to remove the provision of housing on the land designated for the new shopping centre and business units in order to repurpose the land for general business. Provisions were also considered to allow for the widening of Stanley Road. The site chosen for the shopping centre was occupied by streets of Victorian terraced housing. The streets were named after American states and was informally known as "Little America". The new shopping centre would cover  of land, then occupied by around 148 shops and 441 houses, although the demolition plans were criticized during the inquiry, which considered a view that only 28 of the 441 homes were unfit and that many other houses elsewhere should have been a demolition priority.

Construction
Construction work started in 1965, with demolition of existing residential dwellings starting sometime around July 1965. The first phase of construction involved the laying of a new £55,000 sewer from April that year. Support piles  were laid from September 1965, with expectations that the first shops would be open in time for Christmas 1966. Full completion was expected to be in 1968, the centenary year of Bootle receiving its municipal charter. In November 1966, building work was delayed by around five weeks following strike action of builders employed by William Thornton and Sons, the main contractors. Work resumed in December 1966.

By March 1967, construction work was described as "proceeding rapidly", with lettings of shops progressing well. There had been prior concerns expressed that the centre could end up being a white elephant, although the council were happy with the progress being made. Bootle Corporation and developer Ravenself Properties Limited held a competition to find the best six names for new pedestrian ways that were a planned feature in the new shopping centre. The prize for the winner was £25 with an additional two £5 consolation prizes. The winning name was announced in March 1965, with the entry "New Strand" by 11-year-old Dorothy Hawkins winning first prize. The consolation prizes went to George Penlington and May Taylor, who submitted "Stanley Mons Strand" and "Little America" respectively. An almost identical entry to the winning one was submitted by someone else, however their entry was later than that of Hawkins' and the earlier one was chosen as the winner.

Original plans included a further development stage which would have provided a high level approach to the centre from the New Strand railway station platform, but this did not materialise. The car parking facilities, provided in the form of a multi-storey car park, where described as being "on a scale unknown on Merseyside". The centre was originally designed almost entirely as concrete, with canopies from the shops that left areas of the walkway exposed to the elements. Originally, the main entrance was to be the Hexagon on Washington Parade, however when a grander plan to pedestrianise Stanley Road failed to materialise, the Stanley Road entrance became the primary entry point, leaving the shopping centre "somewhat back to front". Arches would later be added to the Stanley Road end in an attempt to reverse the polarity.

Opening
The Strand opened on 4 October 1968 by Mayor of Bootle, Alderman Oliver Ellis as part of a larger Bootle redevelopment during this period, having previously been streets of housing. Development of the £5 million centre, constructed by Ravenseft Properties, was hoped to transform Bootle into "one of the most dynamic areas of the North West".

The precinct was designed by T. P. Bennett with attention to detail that made "clear that it is a showpiece of a self-confident town". Over the main entrance was a ridged tent-like roof which was described as being among Bootle's "most prominent landmarks", while the entrance hall was compared to being like the entrance of "a ballroom or opera house". Many of the new shops had previously held premises on Stanley Road and proudly proclaimed in the window of their former premises that "we have moved to the New Strand". On opening day, there were over 60 shops open, among them larger stores that may have otherwise not come to Bootle without the lure of the new shopping centre.

Operation
The centre received a significant revamp in 1988, which included a roof over the lower palatine, a pram ramp and an extension to the balcony for residential tenants. Support for the balcony extension was mixed, with around as many in opposition as there were in support. The planning committee by councilors in October 1987 approved the plans having previous rejected an earlier application by Ravenseft Properties Limited in August 1987 on the grounds that the plans would be "detrimental to the visual amenity of the Palatine residents". Many shopkeepers petitioned in favour of the plans, noting that the redevelopment proposal would modernise the centre, making it more attractive and offering protection to shoppers during bad weather. The refurbishment was overseen by the manager Peter Williams, who oversaw a transition into something "approximating the American mall, with the primary objectives being to "create an ambience of comfort and security", with aluminum planking covering the concrete walls and Italian ceramic tiles and granite replacing the old flooring. The relaunch of the centre came in autumn 1989, with live entertainment and performances as part of a "Grand Opening Extravaganza". By this time, there were 114 shops in the centre, of which the anchor stores were Marks & Spencer, TJ Hughes and Woolworths. Footfall was estimated at around 120,000 a week.

Bulger kidnapping

On Friday 12 February 1993, the New Strand Shopping Centre came to significant attention within CCTV footage when two-year-old James Bulger was abducted from a shopping centre and murdered on a nearby railway line by two 10-year-old minors, Jon Venables and Robert Thompson. They were charged of two crimes on 20 February. Nine months later on 24 November, they were found guilty, becoming the youngest convicted murderers in modern British history.

Redevelopment
The Strand saw its first major redevelopment and expansion in 1997-1998, conceived in response to the shortage of larger sized units in Bootle. The redevelopment project consisted of a  expansion to the existing shopping centre mall, providing new floor space to a host of new retailers, whilst also providing a direct link into a new bus station and transport interchange for Merseyrail, all being completed in November 1998. Additional parking facilities were provided in the form of a new multi storey carpark which complements the existing multi story carpark adjacent.

Ellandi acquisition
The centre was purchased by London-based Ellandi in 2014, who announced plans to update the signage, improve accessibility and bring in new retailers. Under their ownership, the return of anchor tenant TJ Hughes was announced, as well as a vacancy rate decrease to less than 10%, with a footfall increase of 14% each year.

Council ownership

Ellandi sold the shopping centre in 2017 to Sefton Council for £32.5m, who cited the desire to protect local jobs and assist towards a wider region regeneration, as well as to generate a stable income for the council. The council spent almost £700,000 on legal advice for the purchase of the shopping centre. An estimated 118,000 shoppers visited the centre weekly in 2017. Despite the sale, Ellandi will continue to manage the shopping centre, whilst working alongside Sefton Council to deliver their regeneration strategy.

During the COVID-19 pandemic, the centre lost around £2.7 million up to March 2021, although this was at the lower end of estimates which predicted potential losses of over £3 million. It was the first year since the acquisition by the council in 2017 that the centre had lost money, primarily due to lockdown measures preventing shops from opening. In the year prior to the pandemic, the centre made just £30,000 in profit.

Stores
Stores in the shopping centre include TJ Hughes, New Look, Iceland, B&M,  and JD Sports. TJ Hughes is the centre's largest tenant since returning to bigger premises in October 2015, having previously closed in 2011.

Transport links

It is served by the Bootle New Strand railway station running on the Northern Line, with trains running to Southport and Liverpool city centre. The station was renamed from Marsh Lane in honour of the new shopping centre development. Bus links to the Strand became much improved following the extension which took place during 1999, which included a new bus terminal amongst other extensions to the main building.

Awards
The shopping centre has won a Home Office award for its efforts in tackling crime, with just a handful of other towns and cities in the North West of England gaining the honour. Following a fall in crime rates to become one of the lowest in the region, it was granted a Safer Business Award.

References
Citations

Sources

External links

Shopping centres in Merseyside
Buildings and structures in the Metropolitan Borough of Sefton
Bootle